Jahai (Jehai) is an aboriginal Mon–Khmer language spoken by the Jahai people living in the montane rainforests of northern Peninsular Malaysia and southernmost Thailand. It is the largest Northern Aslian language. Though spoken by only a little more than 1,000 people, Jahai does not appear to be in immediate danger of extinction due to the prevalence of Jahai parents passing on the language to their children as their mother tongue. 

Jahai has a unique vocabulary for describing odors.

Phonology

Vowels

Consonants

Olfactory categories 
Odor terms in Jahai are based on abstract qualities rather than specific sources (which is more common cross-linguistically, particularly in European languages).

See also
 Kensiu language

References

External links 
 http://projekt.ht.lu.se/rwaai RWAAI (Repository and Workspace for Austroasiatic Intangible Heritage)
 http://hdl.handle.net/10050/00-0000-0000-0003-6701-4@view Jahai in RWAAI Digital Archive
 Jahai DoReCo corpus compiled by Niclas Burenhult. Audio recordings of narrative texts with transcriptions time-aligned at the phone level, translations, and - for some texts - time-aligned morphological annotations.

Languages of Malaysia
Languages of Thailand
Aslian languages